The phrase What Comes Around Goes Around could refer to one of several things:

 What Goes Around Comes Around is a 1979 album by Waylon Jennings. 
 What Comes Around Goes Around, a 1990 song by the band Tuff as well as their Atlantic Records album released May 14, 1991.
 What Goes Around.../...Comes Around, a 2006 song by American singer Justin Timberlake.